James Cockburn Hugall (26 April 1889 – 23 September 1927) was an English professional footballer, best remembered for his 12 years in the Football League with Clapton Orient. A goalkeeper, he also played league football for Durham City and Hamilton Academical.

Personal life 
Hugall served as a corporal in the Football Battalion of the Middlesex Regiment during the First World War and was commissioned as a lieutenant into the 12th (Service) Battalion of the Durham Light Infantry on 24 July 1916. During the course of his service, he was wounded in both legs, the left eye and the left shoulder. At the time of Hugall's death after an operation in September 1927, he was the manager the George & Dragon hotel in Sunderland.

Career statistics

References

1889 births
1927 deaths
People from Whitburn, Tyne and Wear
Footballers from Tyne and Wear
English footballers
Association football goalkeepers
Sunderland Rovers F.C. players
Leyton Orient F.C. players
Hamilton Academical F.C. players
Durham City A.F.C. players
Seaham Colliery Welfare F.C. players
English Football League players
Scottish Football League players
Leeds City F.C. wartime guest players
Sunderland A.F.C. wartime guest players
British Army personnel of World War I
Durham Light Infantry officers
Middlesex Regiment soldiers
Military personnel from County Durham